Mohamed Semida Abdel Azim, commonly known as Mohamed Azima, (born 17 October 1968) is a former Egypt international football midfielder who played for clubs in Egypt, Germany, Austria and South Korea.

Career
Born in Egypt, Azima began playing football for local side Al-Ahly S.C.

In 1990, Azima moved to Germany to sign for 2. Bundesliga side SC Fortuna Köln. He would make 35 appearances in the German second division, the last nine with VfB Oldenburg.

Azima moved to Austria where he would play for SK Vorwärts Steyr, and won the 1996 K-League championship in South Korea with Ulsan Hyundai Horang-i.

Azima made several appearances for the Egypt national football team, and played at the 1992 African Cup of Nations finals.

References

External links
 
 
 

1968 births
Living people
Egyptian footballers
Egyptian expatriate footballers
Egypt international footballers
1992 African Cup of Nations players
Al Ahly SC players
SC Fortuna Köln players
VfB Oldenburg players
Arminia Bielefeld players
FC 08 Homburg players
Ulsan Hyundai FC players
Austrian Football Bundesliga players
2. Bundesliga players
K League 1 players
Expatriate footballers in Germany
Expatriate footballers in Austria
Expatriate footballers in South Korea
SC Pfullendorf players
Egyptian Premier League players
Association football midfielders
Al-Faisaly SC managers
Expatriate football managers in Germany
Expatriate football managers in Jordan
Expatriate football managers in Bahrain
Egyptian football managers
Egyptian expatriate football managers
Egyptian expatriate sportspeople in Jordan